Borophaga is a genus of phorid flies.

Species
B. femorata (Meigen, 1830)
B. flavimana (Meigen, 1830)
B. fuscicornis Borgmeier, 1968
B. fuscipalpis Schmitz, 1952
B. germanica (Schmitz, 1918)
B. incrassata (Meigen, 1830)
B. inflata Beyer, 1958
B. insignis Borgmeier & Prado, 1975
B. irregularis (Wood, 1912)
B. minor Beyer, 1958
B. multisetalis Colyer, 1966
B. okellyi Schmitz, 1937
B. orientalis Beyer, 1958
B. pachycostalis (Borgmeier, 1923)
B. rufibasis Beyer, 1959
B. simia Beyer, 1965
B. subagilis Beyer, 1958
B. subsultans (Linnaeus, 1758, 1767)
B. thoracalis Beyer, 1958
B. tibialis Liu & Zeng, 1995
B. tinctipennis Borgmeier, 1963
B. verticalis Borgmeier, 1962

References

Phoridae
Platypezoidea genera